The economy of Sindh is the 2nd largest of all the provinces in Pakistan. Much of Sindh's economy is influenced by the economy of Karachi, the largest city and economic capital of the country. Historically, Sindh's contribution to Pakistan's GDP has been between 30% to 32.7%. Its share in the service sector has ranged from 21% to 27.8% and in the agriculture sector from 21.4% to 27.7%. Performance-wise, its best sector is the manufacturing sector, where its share has ranged from 36.7% to 46.5%. Since 1972, Sindh's GDP has expanded by 3.6 times.

Endowed with coastal access, Sindh is a major centre of economic activity in Pakistan and has a highly diversified economy ranging from heavy industry and finance centred in and around Karachi to a substantial agricultural base along the Indus. Manufacturing includes machine products, cement, plastics, and various other goods.

Agriculture plays an important role in Sindh with cotton, rice, wheat, sugar cane, bananas, and mangoes as the most important crops. The largest and finer quality of rice is produced in Larkano district.

Sindh is the richest province in natural resources of gas, petrol, and coal. The Mari Gas field is the biggest producer of natural gas in the country, with companies like Mari Petroleum. Thar coalfield also includes a large lignite deposit.

Tourism

See also
Economy of Karachi
Economy of Pakistan
Sindh Cities Improvement Program

References

 
Sindh